Sissons may refer to:

Sissons (surname)
5170 Sissons, main-belt asteroid
J.H. Sissons School, elementary school in Yellowknife, Northwest Territories, Canada 
Sissons Corner, Virginia, community in the U.S. state of Virginia
Sisson's Peony Gardens, Peony garden located in Rosendale, Wisconsin

See also 
 Sisson, a surname